John Floyer ( 1681 – 4 June 1762) was an English politician from Staffordshire.

Early life
John Floyer was born circa 1681. He was the oldest son of the physician Sir John Floyer of Hints Hall, near Lichfield in Staffordshire. His mother Mary was the daughter and co-heir of Sir Henry Archbold of Abbots Bromley, Staffordshire, the chancellor of the diocese of Lichfield. She was the widow of Arthur Fleetwood of Lichfield and mother of Henry Fleetwood, the Member of Parliament (MP) for Preston.

Career
At the 1741 general election, he was elected as a Tory MP for Tamworth. However, his election was overturned on petition on 22 March 1742, and he never stood for Parliament again.

In 1743 his name was included in a list of leading Jacobite sympathizers prepared for the French foreign office.

References
 

1681 births
Year of birth uncertain
1762 deaths
Members of the Parliament of Great Britain for English constituencies
British MPs 1741–1747
People from Hints, Staffordshire
English Jacobites
Tory MPs (pre-1834)